Charmes may refer to the following places in France:

 Charmes, Aisne, a commune in the department of Aisne
 Charmes, Allier, a commune in the department of Allier
 Charmes, Côte-d'Or, a commune in the department of Côte-d'Or
 Charmes, Haute-Marne, a commune in the department of Haute-Marne
 Charmes, Vosges, a commune in the department of Vosges
 Charmes-en-l'Angle, a commune in the department of Haute-Marne
 Charmes-la-Côte, a commune in the department of Meurthe-et-Moselle
 Charmes-la-Grande, a commune in the department of Haute-Marne
 Charmes-Saint-Valbert, a commune in the department of Haute-Saône
 Charmes-sur-l'Herbasse, a commune in the department of Drôme
 Charmes-sur-Rhône, a commune in the department of Ardèche
 Charmes-Chambertin, a grand cru vineyard in the department of Côte-d'Or

See also 
 Charme (disambiguation)